Raffaele Cantone is an Italian magistrate who was appointed President of the Anti-corruption National Authority on 24 March 2014 by the Italian prime mMinister, Matteo Renzi. Cantone held the office until October 2019.

Biography
Born in Naples on 24 November 1963, he grew up in Giugliano. He graduated in law at the University of Naples Federico II with the intention of becoming a lawyer and entered the Italian magistrature in 1991, participating in a competition for 160 posts on the advice to undertake this career provided by his uncle, Nicola Giovannone, a marshal major of the Guardia di Finanza. He is also a writer of some articles published in the Italian journal Il Mattino and wrote a book about his life, Solo per Giustizia, that was published in 2008.

References

External links

1963 births
Living people
Italian prosecutors
Jurists from Naples
People from Giugliano in Campania